Ansel Polak Daniels (2 August 1842, The Hague - 1 April 1891, The Hague) was a Dutch chess master.

He won the Dutch Championship at The Hague 1877, and also won at The Hague 1878; he took 7th at The Hague 1881 and Rotterdam 1883. Polak was the son of Meijer Polak Daniels and Alida Ezechiels and was married to Elise Marchand.

References

1842 births
1891 deaths
Dutch chess players
Jewish chess players
Jewish Dutch sportspeople
Dutch Jews
Sportspeople from The Hague
19th-century chess players